Willy Bertin (born August 26, 1944) is an Italian ski mountaineer and former cross-country skier and biathlete.

Bertin was born in Angrogna. Together with Felice Darioli and Lino Zanon he finished fourth in the 1971, and second in the 1973 Trofeo Mezzalama, and together with Darioli and Fabrizio Pedranzini, he placed third in the military team category in the 1975 edition of the same competition, which was carried out as the first World Championship of Skimountaineering.

Selected biathlon results
 1970: 2nd, Italian championships of biathlon, large calibre
 1971: 2nd, Italian championships of biathlon
 1972:
 3rd, Italian championships of biathlon, large calibre
 10th, Winter Olympics 4 × 7.5 kilometres relay (together with Giovanni Astegiano, Corrado Varesco and Lino Jordan)
 16th, Winter Olympics 20 kilometres
 1st, Italian men's championships of cross-country skiing, relay, together with Felice Darioli, Serafino Guadagnini and Renzo Chiocchetti
 1975: 3rd, Italian championships of biathlon, large calibre
 1974:
 1st, Italian championships of biathlon
 3rd, Italian championships of biathlon, sprint large calibre
 1975: 2nd, Italian championships of biathlon, sprint large calibre
 1976:
 1st, Italian championships of biathlon, sprint
 2nd, Italian championships of biathlon
 4th, Winter Olympics 20 kilometres
 6th, Winter Olympics 4 × 7.5 kilometres relay (together with Lino Jordan, Pierantonio Clementi and Luigi Weiss)
 1977:
 1st, Italian championships of biathlon
 2nd, Italian championships of biathlon, sprint
 1978:
 1st, Italian championships of biathlon
 2nd, Italian championships of biathlon, sprint

Selected cross-country skiing results 
 1972: 3rd, Italian men's championships of skiing, 15 km

External links
 Willy Bertin at sportsreferences.com

References

1944 births
Living people
Italian male ski mountaineers
Italian male biathletes
Italian male cross-country skiers
Italian military patrol (sport) runners
Olympic biathletes of Italy
Biathletes at the 1972 Winter Olympics
Biathletes at the 1976 Winter Olympics
Sportspeople from the Metropolitan City of Turin